James Baldwin (born 28 August 1997) is a British racing driver and sim racer. He raced in the 2020 British GT Championship and the 2020 Formula One eSports Series.

Career
Baldwin began his racing career in karting aged 8, and won three DMAX National Championships at Daytona Motorsport between 2013 and 2014. He switched to Formula Ford in 2015 and competed in four races. He ran competitively despite having little track time and facing mechanical issues, but was unable to raise the funds to continue racing. He shifted his focus to sim racing and soon found himself invited to professional events with prize money available, offering a chance to reboot his career.

Race of Champions 
Baldwin won the 2019 eROC Invitational Event, gaining entry to the 2019 Race of Champions. There, he won the eROC World Final. The prize was to represent Team Sim Racing All Stars in the Nations Cup, partnering future Formula One eSports Series rival Enzo Bonito.

Baldwin returned to ROC for the 2020 edition, held this year as a virtual event. He teamed with Romain Grosjean to win the Nations Cup as Team All Stars, having earned his place by winning the eROC World Final for a second time.

After not being held in 2021, Baldwin returned for the 2022 Race of Champions. Following two consecutive qualifications for the main event, he missed out on a slot in the Sim Racing All Stars team for the Nations Cup after losing out to Lucas Blakeley and Jarno Opmeer in the eRoc World Final.

World's Fastest Gamer 
In 2019, his success in sim racing resulted in an invitation to Season 2 of World's Fastest Gamer (WFG), a twelve-day intensive competition between sim racers from multiple platforms. Baldwin went on to win the event and was awarded a $1 million sponsorship for a full racing season. He was the first WFG graduate to receive backing for a real-world drive. The competition was televised in a six-part documentary series on ESPN2 and Amazon Prime.

Formula One eSports 
Baldwin signed for Alfa Romeo as a third driver for the 2019 Formula One eSports series. He moved to McLaren for the 2020 season, ending the season 17th with a best result of 8th and two fastest laps.

British GT Championship 
On 5 March 2020, Baldwin was announced as a driver for Jenson Team Rocket RJN, partnering team co-owner Chris Buncombe in a McLaren 720S GT3 in the GT World Challenge Europe Endurance Cup. Due to travel difficulties brought about by the COVID-19 pandemic, this was later amended to a full-season entry in the 2020 British GT Championship alongside Michael O'Brien.

Baldwin reached national headlines by winning on debut at Oulton Park. The pair went on to take three further podiums and three pole positions, finishing fourth in the overall championship and third in the Silver Cup.

Baldwin dominated the 2021 British GT Esports Championship, with three wins from five races.

On 29 April 2021, Baldwin was announced as a BRDC Rising Star.

24 Hours of Spa Francorchamps 
On 20 June 2022, Baldwin announced, via hs Instagram account, that he would be racing in the 2022 edition of the 24 Hours of Spa, thanks to the support of the company Travel Planet. He would be driving a Garage 59 entered McLaren 720S GT3, alongside Nicolai Kjærgaard, Manuel Maldonado, and Ethan Simioni, racing in the Silver Cup class. 

After qualifying 26th overall and 5th in class, ahead of all other McLaren entries, as well as dominating the Fanatec Esports GT Pro Series virtual support race, Baldwin failed to finish the race following a radiator problem on lap 227.

FIA Motorsport Games 
On the 29th October 2022, Baldwin competed for the United Kingdom in the FIA Motorsport Games Esports Cup hosted at Circuit Paul Ricard in France. Baldwin finished the Final in front of Dutch simracer Chris Harteveld and won the first Gold medal for the UK in FIA Motorsport Games history.

Racing record

Complete British GT Championship results
(key) (Races in bold indicate pole position in class) (Races in italics indicate fastest lap in class)

Complete Spa 24 Hour results

References

External links
 
 

1997 births
Living people
British racing drivers
British GT Championship drivers
FIA Motorsport Games drivers